I Am Somebody may refer to:
 I Am Somebody (2015 film), a Hong Kong drama film
 I Am Somebody (1970 film), a short political documentary
 "I Am – Somebody", a poem often recited by Reverend Jesse Jackson
 "I Am Somebody", a song by Bliss n Eso from the album Circus in the Sky